Mariakerke is a seaside resort in the West Flanders province of Belgium. Previously a village of its own just to the west of Ostend, it now forms part of that town. It has 11,305 inhabitants.

History
The oldest reference to the town dates to 1171, when it is called S. Mariae Capella. 

Ostend
Populated places in West Flanders